David Emmanuel Martínez Morales (born 7 February 2006) is a Venezuelan footballer who plays as a forward for Monagas.

Career statistics

Club

Notes

References

2006 births
Living people
People from El Tigre
Venezuelan footballers
Association football forwards
Venezuelan Primera División players
Monagas S.C. players